The South Greenhill River is a river in Algoma District and Sudbury District in northeastern Ontario, Canada. It is in the James Bay drainage basin, and is a right tributary of the Greenhill River.

Course
The river begins on open ground in geographic Winget Township, Algoma District, in part of the South Greenhill Lake Sand Delta Conservation Reserve. It heads southwest into geographic Rennie Township, Sudbury District and into South Greenhill Lake. The lake takes the river back northeast into Winget Township and then into geographic Amik Township, where it then leaves the conservation reserve. The river heads northeast, takes in the right tributary Mang Creek, and passes northeast through the northwest corner of geographic Abigo Township. The river continues northeast into geographic Nebotik Township, and reaches its mouth at the Greenhill River. The Greenhill River flows via the Missinaibi River and the Moose River to James Bay.

Drainage basin
The entire drainage basin (watershed) is within Algoma District, with the exception of short portion of the river as it enters South Greenhill Lake, the southwest tip of that lake, and the small watershed of a creek entering the southwest tip of South Greenhill Lake, that is in Sudbury District.

Natural history
The South Greenhill Lake Sand Delta Conservation Reserve has mammals including the pine marten and beaver, and bird species such as the red-tailed hawk.

Recreation
There is an outpost camp on the south end of South Greenhill Lake leased for use as a remote fishing and wildlife observation tourism location."

Tributaries
Mang Creek (right)

References

Sources

Rivers of Algoma District
Rivers of Sudbury District